Final Encounter is a Cantopop album by Leslie Cheung released on 22 December 1989 by Cinepoly Records of Hong Kong. This album was supposed to commemorate his departure from the music industry in Hong Kong and to concentrate largely on his acting career in 1989.

Many songs from this album were taken and sung in his series of farewell concert at the HK Coliseum and these include "风再起时"  ("When the Wind Blows Again"), "我眼中的她"  ("She in My Eyes"),  "寂寞夜晚"  ("Lonely Night") and  "WHY". The Cantonese cover version of Janet Jackson's "Miss You Much" is also on the album and was also sung at the farewell concerts.

Cheung chose the song "The Wind Blows Again" as the opening song for his first live concert (1997) after returning from his long absence due to semi-retirement for his performances.

Leslie Cheung albums
1989 albums
Cinepoly Records albums